Kochangadi is a small area in west Kochi in Ernakulam district of Kerala state south India. It is reputed for Chempittapally which is an old Mosque of historical importance. Main junction of Kochangadi is Ammayimukku which is now known as 'KC Road or Kochangadi Cross Road'. Kochangadi bears the new ward number of 06 of Cochin Corporation, the old number being 13.
Uru art harbour, a major art and cultural center is situated in kochangadi http://uruartharbour.com/  
Suburbs of Kochi